Elmwood, also known as the Hugh Caperton House, is a historic home located near Union, Monroe County, West Virginia.  It was built in the 1830s, and is a two-story, nearly square brick dwelling with Greek Revival details. The front facade features wide limestone steps and a veranda, with second-story balcony, Chinese Chippendale railings at both levels, and four plain but huge plaster covered brick columns. The house was built by Congressman Hugh Caperton (1781–1847).  It was home to Allen T. Caperton (1810–1876), the first ex-Confederate elected to the United States Senate after the American Civil War.

It was listed on the National Register of Historic Places in 1976. It is located in the Union Historic District, listed in 1990.

References

Gallery

Houses on the National Register of Historic Places in West Virginia
Greek Revival houses in West Virginia
Houses completed in 1835
Houses in Monroe County, West Virginia
National Register of Historic Places in Monroe County, West Virginia
Individually listed contributing properties to historic districts on the National Register in West Virginia
Caperton family of Virginia and West Virginia
Plantations in West Virginia